The West Alabama Tigers college football team represents the University of West Alabama in the Gulf South Conference (GSC). The Tigers compete as part of the National Collegiate Athletic Association (NCAA) NCAA Division II. The program has had 20 head coaches since it began play during the 1938 season. Since December 2013, Brett Gilliland has served as West Alabama's head coach.

The team has played nearly 700 games over 71 seasons of West Alabama football. In that time, five coaches have led the Tigers to postseason appearances: Morris Higginbotham, Mickey Andrews, Jim King, Bobby Wallace and Hall. Hall led the Tigers to their first outright Gulf South championship in 2012. Andrews won West Alabama's lone national championship in 1971 as a member of the National Association of Intercollegiate Athletics.

Gilliland is the leader in seasons coached with eight years with the program and the leader in games won with 52 and Andrews has the highest winning percentage of those who have coached more than one game, with .750. Robert Cire has the lowest winning percentage of those who have coached more than one game, with .100. Will Hall led the Tigers to both of their GSC championships. Of the 20 different head coaches who have led the Tigers, Vaughn Mancha has been inducted into the College Football Hall of Fame in South Bend, Indiana.

Key

Coaches

Notes

References 
General

 West Alabama Coaching Records . College Football Data Warehouse. Retrieved February 18, 2012.
 

Specific

Lists of college football head coaches

Alabama sports-related lists